The Nilsson model is a nuclear shell model treating the atomic nucleus as a deformed sphere. In 1953, the first experimental examples were found of rotational bands in nuclei, with their energy levels following the same J(J+1) pattern of energies as in rotating molecules. Quantum mechanically, it is impossible to have a collective rotation of a sphere, so this implied that the shape of these nuclei was nonspherical. In principle, these rotational states could have been described as coherent superpositions of particle-hole excitations in the basis consisting of single-particle states of the spherical potential. But in reality, the description of these states in this manner is intractable, due to the large number of valence particles—and this intractability was even greater in the 1950s, when computing power was extremely rudimentary. For these reasons, Aage Bohr, Ben Mottelson, and Sven Gösta Nilsson constructed models in which the potential was deformed into an ellipsoidal shape. The first successful model of this type is the one now known as the Nilsson model. It is essentially a nuclear shell model using a harmonic oscillator potential, but with anisotropy added, so that the oscillator frequencies along the three Cartesian axes are not all the same. Typically the shape is a prolate ellipsoid, with the axis of symmetry taken to be z.

Hamiltonian
For an axially symmetric shape with the axis of symmetry being the z axis, the Hamiltonian is

The anisotropy of the potential is such that the length of an equipotential along the z is greater than the length on the transverse axes in the ratio . This is conventionally expressed in terms of a deformation parameter δ so that the harmonic oscillator part of the potential can be written as the sum of a spherically symmetric harmonic oscillator and a term proportional to δ. Positive values of δ indicate prolate deformations, like an American football. Most nuclei in their ground states have equilibrium shapes such that δ ranges from 0 to 0.2, while superdeformed states have  (a 2-to-1 axis ratio).

The mathematical details of the deformation parameters are as follows. Considering the success of the nuclear liquid drop model, in which the nucleus is taken to be an incompressible fluid, the harmonic oscillator frequencies are constrained so that  remains constant with deformation, preserving the volume of equipotential surfaces. Reproducing the observed density of nuclear matter requires , where A is the mass number.

The remaining two terms in the Hamiltonian do not relate to deformation and are present in the spherical shell model as well. The spin-orbit term represents the spin-orbit dependence of the strong nuclear force; it is much larger than, and has the opposite sign compared to, the special-relativistic spin-orbit splitting. The purpose of the  term is to mock up the flat profile of the nuclear potential as a function of radius. For nuclear wavefunctions (unlike atomic wavefunctions) states with high angular momentum have their probability density concentrated at greater radii. The term  prevents this from shifting a major shell up or down as a whole. Typical values of κ and μ for heavy nuclei are 0.06 and 0.5. With this parametrization,  occurs as a simple scaling factor throughout all the calculations.

Choice of basis and quantum numbers
For ease of computation using the computational resources of the 1950s, Nilsson used a basis consisting of eigenstates of the spherical hamiltonian. They couple the different N shells. Eigenstates of the deformed Hamiltonian have good parity (corresponding to even or odd N) and  Ω, the projection of the total angular momentum along the symmetry axis. In the absence of a cranking term (see below), time-reversal symmetry causes states with opposite signs of Ω to be degenerate, so that in the calculations only positive values of Ω need to be considered.

Interpretation
In an odd, well-deformed nucleus, the single-particle levels are filled up to the Fermi level, and the odd particle's Ω and parity give the spin and parity of the ground state.

Cranking
Because the potential is not spherically symmetric, the single-particle states are not states of good angular momentum J. However, a Lagrange multiplier , known as a "cranking" term, can be added to the Hamiltonian. Usually the angular frequency vector ω is taken to be perpendicular to the symmetry axis, although tilted-axis cranking can also be considered. Filling the single-particle states up to the Fermi level then produces states whose expected angular momentum along the cranking axis  has the desired value set by the Lagrange multiplier.

Total energy
Often one wants to calculate a total energy as a function of deformation. Minima of this function are predicted equilibrium shapes. Adding the single-particle energies does not work for this purpose, partly because kinetic and potential terms are out of proportion by a factor of two, and partly because small errors in the energies accumulate in the sum. For this reason, such sums are usually renormalized using a procedure introduced by Strutinsky.

Plots of energy levels

Single-particle levels can be shown in a "spaghetti plot," as functions of the deformation. A large gap between energy levels at zero deformation indicates a particle number at which there is a shell closure: the traditional "magic numbers." Any such gap, at a zero or nonzero deformation, indicates that when the Fermi level is at that height, the nucleus will be stable relative to the liquid drop model.

External links
 An open-source software implementation

References
 Nilsson, S.G. "Binding states of individual nucleons in strongly deformed nuclei," doctoral thesis, 1955
 Olivius, P., "Extending the nuclear cranking model to tilted axis rotation and alternative mean field potentials," doctoral thesis, Lund University, 2004, http://www.matfys.lth.se/staff/Peter.Olivius/thesis.pdf — describes a modern implementation of the model
 Strutinsky, Nucl. Phys. A122 (1968) 1 -- original paper on the Strutinsky method
 Salamon and Kruppa, "Curvature Correction in the Strutinsky's Method," http://arxiv.org/abs/1004.0079 — an open-access description of the Strutinsky method
 Unknown author, "Appendix Nuclear Structure", with a full array of Nilsson charts for both proton and neutron shells, as well as an equivalent diagram for simple harmonic oscillator nuclei at different deformations: https://application.wiley-vch.de/books/info/0-471-35633-6/toi99/www/struct/struct.pdf ***
Nuclear physics